No Rest for the Brave is a 2003 French / Austrian comedy film directed by Alain Guiraudie. The film was screened at the Directors' Fortnight event of the 2003 Cannes Film Festival.

Cast 
 Thomas Suire - Basile Matin / Hector
 Laurent Soffiati - Johnny Got
 Thomas Blanchard - Igor
 Jeanine Canezin - La mère de Basile
 Evelyne Bruniquel-Lebert - La voisine / La cliente / Le couple de pompiste

References

External links 

2003 comedy films
2003 films
Austrian comedy films
French comedy films
2000s French films